Joseph H. Dickinson was an organ maker and state legislator in Michigan. He served two terms in the Michigan House of Representatives representing Wayne County, Michigan's 1st District from 1897 to 1900. Dickinson was the second African-American to serve in the Michigan Legislature after William Webb Ferguson, who began his first term in 1893. He was born in Canada and moved with his family to Detroit. He married Eva Gould.

References

Year of birth missing
African-American state legislators in Michigan
Politicians from Detroit
People from Wayne County, Michigan
Organ builders